Telenor Pakistan (Pvt.) Limited (Urdu: ٹیلی نار پاکستان) is the second largest cellular & digital services provider in Pakistan owned by Telenor Group, which is an international provider of voice, data, content and mobile communication services in 9 markets worldwide in Scandinavia and Asia. Telenor started out as a public company in 1855. Irfan Wahab Khan is the current CEO of Telenor Pakistan since August 2016.

Currently, Telenor Pakistan has a total subscriber base of 49 million with 26% cellular market share in Pakistan and more than 1,300 employees. Since its launch in 2005, the company has made an investment of more than $5 billion.

History

License 
Telenor acquired a license for providing GSM services in Pakistan in April 2004, and launched its services commercially in Karachi, Islamabad, and Rawalpindi on 15 March 2005; it expanded its services to Lahore, Faisalabad and Hyderabad on 23 March 2005. Telenor Pakistan's corporate headquarters are in Islamabad, with regional offices in Peshawar, Lahore, Faisalabad, Multan, Hyderabad, Quetta and Karachi.

Inauguration 
The official opening of Telenor Pakistan was held in Islamabad in which former president of Pakistan General Pervez Musharraf was the guest of honor and was attended by Telenor delegation headed by president and CEO of Telenor Group Jon Fredrik Baksaas along with then CEO of Telenor Pakistan Tore Johnsen. The first call at the inauguration was made by former President Pervez Musharraf to the prime minister of Norway, Jens Stoltenberg, who was visiting Australia at the time.

Inauguration of New Headquarters in Islamabad  
Telenor Pakistan's new headquarter named '345' was inaugurated in Islamabad on 1 November 2017 by the then prime minister of Pakistan Shahid Khaqan Abbasi. The new headquarter was built at a cost of $80 million.

Operations

Coverage 
Telenor Pakistan covers more than 80% of Pakistan's population in urban and rural areas with a network of over 12,000 cell sites of which 80% are 3G and 70% are 4G enabled. The company has been awarded a number of projects under Universal Service Fund (USF) of which the one currently in progress in the Broadband for Sustainable Development (BSD) program under which more than 100 new cell sites will be established to bring connectivity to 1.7 million in Dera Ismail Khan and Mohmand Agency. In the past, Telenor worked on USF Projects for cell site installation in Bahawalpur-Cholistan district in 2009 and provision of 3G services in Kohistan district in 2017.

Radio Frequency

Sales and distribution 
Telenor Pakistan's distribution network has over 220,000 touch points across Pakistan that include franchises, sahulat ghars and retailers that offer GSM products and Easypaisa services. In 2017, company owned customer sales and service centers were converted to Digital Customer Touch Points that include Self Service Booths, IVR, web and social media customer services.

Next generation mobile services (NGMS) 
Telenor is the first to officially launch 4.5G (LTE Advanced) in Pakistan. It has done so by aggregating two 4G bands, FDD-LTE Band 5 (850 MHz) and FDD-LTE Band 3 (1800 MHz), a portion of which has been re-farmed for 4G, it was previously used on the 2G (GPRS/EDGE) network. Telenor's LTE-A network was initially available in all major cities of Pakistan.

VoLTE 
After conducting trials and internal testing, Telenor Pakistan launched Voice over LTE (VoLTE) on 29 January 2019. This makes it the first network in Pakistan to launch VoLTE. Telenor's VoLTE in Pakistan is based on an open source platform and has been developed in-house. Initially, support for other smartphone OEMs was not enabled despite claims of it being supported. Recently, Telenor's VoLTE services were enabled for select smartphone models, such as Oppo and Realme.

5G Trials 

On 13 March 2020, Telenor had successfully conducted 5G Trials, achieving connectivity speeds in excess of 1.5Gbit/s. This also marked 15 years of its operation in Pakistan.

Easypaisa 

In 2008, Telenor acquired majority shares of Tameer Microfinance Bank Limited for its mobile financial services project. They named the branchless banking service "Easypaisa" and launched it in October 2009. Easypaisa was Pakistan's first branchless banking deployment. Later 'Mobile Wallet' was introduced where normal Telenor Pakistan subscribers could now open a mobile account and make transactions themselves using their cellphones. Easypaisa was cited by CNN as the "model to follow" in launching mobile banking services.

Easypaisa is Pakistan's first and largest mobile money service and third largest in the world (according to CGAP), catering to over 18 million customers. It currently has over 75,000 agents across Pakistan. In October 2014 Telenor Easypaisa introduced several types of accounts at different levels.

Tameer Bank was acquired by Telenor Group in 2016 to become Telenor Microfinance Bank and Easypaisa became a part of the bank. ANT Financial Group which owns the global payment platform Alipay, acquired 45% stake in Telenor Bank for $184.5m in March, 2018.

Digital ecosystem 
Telenor Pakistan started off as a cellular service provider in 2005, but has diversified its offerings. Telenor Pakistan offers a number of 4G-enabled handsets including Telenor Infinity E3, Telenor Infinity E2 and Telenor Infinity A2. The company also provides its customers branded mobile handsets from Samsung and Motorola, in addition to 4G MiFi and 4G Wingle and 3G broadband devices such as 3G Wingle. The company launched Digital Customer TouchPoints in the form of kiosks.

Telenor Velocity is Pakistan's first telco-led accelerator.

Telenor Pakistan has entered into partnerships with various stakeholders. Telenor Pakistan collaborated with UNICEF to implement digital birth registration through cellular devices. Telenor Pakistan has collaborated with the government on various initiatives that include rehabilitation of middle level public schools in Punjab, establishing an Open Mind Pakistan Assistive Technology Training Center to assist people with disabilities, and creating services to support the agriculture sector through its Connected Agriculture Platform for Punjab (CAPP) and Khushaal Zamindaar ("prosperous landlord") programs to facilitate farmers to improve yields & alert farmers to unfavorable weather conditions.

Awards 
Telenor Pakistan has won a number of awards. In 2011, it won the Prime Minister of Pakistan Trophy for Largest Foreign Direct Investment (Telecom Sector) which was awarded by the Lahore Chamber of Commerce and Industries.

Telenor Pakistan and Tameer Microfinance Bank's Easypaisa won the Shaukat Khanum Social Responsibility Award in 2011. Easypaisa also won the Best Mobile Money Transfer Entrant of the Year Award at the Mobile Money Awards in 2011. In 2012, Easypaisa was declared as the third largest mobile money service by the Consultative Group to Assist the Poor (CGAP).

In 2014, Easypaisa won the Best NFC/Mobile Money Product or Service and Best Mobile Product or Service for Women in Emerging Markets awards at the 19th GSMA Global Mobile Awards in Barcelona, Spain. Telenor Pakistan was named the Best Place to Work in Telecom Industry by Engage Consulting and PSHRM in 2017.

At the 2018 Pakistan Advertisers Society (PAS) Awards, the company won Best in Telecommunications and Best in PR awards for its campaigns. Telenor Pakistan was awarded the "Best Practice Award" by Center for Global Inclusion at the Diversity and Inclusion Conference 2018.

Financial Performance 
Telenor Pakistan has achieved a gross sales of Rs. 25 billion for the quarter Oct-Dec, 2020.

See also 
 Djuice
 List of mobile phone companies in Pakistan

References

External links 
 

Mobile phone companies of Pakistan
Telenor
Privately held companies of Pakistan
Pakistani subsidiaries of foreign companies
Internet service providers of Pakistan
Companies based in Islamabad